Sandpipers are a large family, Scolopacidae, of waders. They include many species called sandpipers, as well as those called by names such as curlew and snipe. The majority of these species eat small invertebrates picked out of the mud or soil. Different lengths of bills enable different species to feed in the same habitat, particularly on the coast, without direct competition for food.

Sandpipers have long bodies and legs, and narrow wings. Most species have a narrow bill, but otherwise the form and length are quite variable. The bills are sensitive, allowing the birds to feel the mud and sand as they probe for food. They generally have dull plumage, with cryptic brown, grey, or streaked patterns, although some display brighter colours during the breeding season.

Most species nest in open areas, and defend their territories with aerial displays. The nest itself is a simple scrape in the ground, in which the bird typically lays three or four eggs. The young of most species are precocial.

Taxonomy
The family Scolopacidae was introduced (as Scolopacea) by the French polymath Constantine Samuel Rafinesque in 1815. The family contains 98 extant or recently extinct species divided into 15 genera. For more details, see the article List of sandpiper species.

Evolution
The early fossil record is scant for a group that was probably present at the non-avian dinosaur's extinction. "Totanus" teruelensis (Late Miocene of Los Mansuetos (Spain) is sometimes considered a scolopacid – maybe a shank – but may well be a larid; little is known of it.

Paractitis has been named from the Early Oligocene of Saskatchewan (Canada), while Mirolia is known from the Middle Miocene at Deiningen in the Nördlinger Ries (Germany). Most living genera would seem to have evolved throughout the Oligocene to Miocene with the waders perhaps a bit later; see the genus accounts for the fossil record.

In addition there are some indeterminable remains that might belong to extant genera or their extinct relatives:
 Scolopacidae gen. et sp. indet. (Middle Miocene of Františkovy Lázně, Czech Republic – Late Miocene of Kohfidisch, Austria)
 Scolopacidae gen. et sp. indet. (Edson Early Pliocene of Sherman County, USA)

Description

The sandpipers exhibit considerable range in size and appearance, the wide range of body forms reflecting a wide range of ecological niches. Within species there is considerable variation in patterns of sexual dimorphism. Males are larger than females in ruffs and several sandpipers, but are smaller than females in the knots, curlews, phalaropes and godwits. The sexes are similarly sized in the snipes, woodcock and tringine sandpipers. Compared to the other large family of wading birds, the plovers (Charadriidae), they tend to have smaller eyes, more slender heads, and longer thinner bills. Some are quite long-legged, and most species have three forward pointing toes with a smaller hind toe (the exception is the sanderling, which lacks a hind toe).

Sandpipers are more geared towards tactile foraging methods than the plovers, which favour more visual foraging methods, and this is reflected in the high density of tactile receptors in the tips of their bills. These receptors are housed in a slight horny swelling at the tip of the bill (except for the surfbird and the two turnstones). Bill shape is highly variable within the family, reflecting differences in feeding ecology. Bill length relative to head length varies from three times the length of the head in the long-billed curlew to just under half the head length in the Tuamotu sandpiper. Bills may be straight, slightly upcurled or strongly downcurved. Like all birds, the bills of sandpipers are capable of cranial kinesis, literally being able to move the bones of the skull (other than the obvious movement of the lower jaw) and specifically bending the upper jaw without opening the entire jaw, an act known as rhynchokinesis. It has been hypothesized this helps when probing by allowing the bill to be partly opened with less force and improving manipulation of prey items in the substrate. Rhynchokinesis is also used by sandpipers feeding on prey in water to catch and manipulate prey.

Distribution, habitat, and movements

The sandpipers have a cosmopolitan distribution, occurring across most of the world's land surfaces except for Antarctica and the driest deserts. A majority of the family breed at moderate to high latitudes in the Northern Hemisphere, in fact accounting for the most northerly breeding birds in the world. Only a few species breed in tropical regions, ten of which are snipes and woodcocks and the remaining species being the unusual Tuamotu sandpiper, which breeds in French Polynesia (although prior to the arrival of humans in the Pacific there were several other closely related species of Polynesian sandpiper).

Diet and feeding
There are broadly four feeding styles employed by the sandpipers, although many species are flexible and may use more than one style. The first is pecking with occasional probing, usually done by species in drier habitats that do not have soft soils or mud. The second, and most frequent, method employed is probing soft soils, muds and sands for prey. The third, used by Tringa shanks, involves running in shallow water with the bill under the water chasing fish, a method that uses sight as well as tactile senses. The final method, employed by the phalaropes and some Calidris sandpipers, involves pecking at the water for small prey. A few species of scolopacids are omnivorous to some extent, taking seeds and shoots as well as invertebrates.

Breeding 
Many sandpipers form monogamous pairs, but some sandpipers have female-only parental care, some male-only parental care, some sequential polyandry and other compete for the mate on the lek. Sandpipers lay three or four eggs into the nest, which is usually a vague depression or scrape in the open ground, scarcely lined with soft vegetation. In species where both parents incubate the eggs, females and males share their incubation duties in various ways both within and between species. In some pairs, parents exchange on the nest in the morning and in the evening so that their incubation rhythm follows a 24-hour day, in others each sex may sit on the nest continuously for up to 24 hours before it is exchanged by its partner. In species where only a single parent incubates the eggs, during the night the parent sits on the eggs nearly continuously and then during the warmest part of a day leaves the nest for short feeding bouts. Chicks hatch after about three weeks of incubation and are able to walk and forage within a few hours of hatching. A single parent or both parents guide and brood the chicks.

Gallery

Footnotes

References

External links

 Sandpiper media on the Internet Bird Collection
 Cornell Lab of Ornithology sandpiper search results
 RedKnot.org links to shorebird recovery sites, movies, events & other information on red knot rufa and horseshoe crabs.

 
Extant Rupelian first appearances
Taxa named by Constantine Samuel Rafinesque